Frank Ifield's Hits is an EP by singer Frank Ifield. It was released in 1963 and spent a total of 13 weeks at number one in the UK EPs Chart in four separate runs.

The EP collected the A and B sides of Ifield's hit singles "I Remember You" and "Lovesick Blues". It was released in mono only.

Track listing
Side A
"I Remember You" 
"I Listen to My Heart"

Side B
"Lovesick Blues"
"She Taught Me How to Yodel"

1963 EPs
Frank Ifield albums
EMI Columbia Records EPs